William Claude Reavis High School simply known as Reavis is a public high school located in Burbank, Illinois., a near southwest suburb of Chicago. It is named for Dr. William Claude Reavis (1881–1955), a professor at the University of Chicago who played a major role in guaranteeing its completion.

Academics
In 2010, Reavis had an average composite ACT score of 19.5 and graduated 96.3% of its senior class.  The average class size is 20.4.  Reavis has not made Adequate Yearly Progress (AYP) on the Prairie State Achievement Examination, which the state of Illinois uses to assess schools as is mandated in the federal No Child Left Behind Act.

Athletics and Activities
Reavis competes in the South Suburban Conference, which was formed in 2006. Reavis is also member of the Illinois High School Association (IHSA), which governs most sports and competitive activities in the state.

The following Reavis teams won or place top four in their respective state championship tournaments sponsored by the IHSA:
 Baseball: 2nd Place (1983–84)
 Bowling (Girls): 2nd Place (1988–89); 3rd Place (1983–84,1987–88)
 Drama: State Champions (2006–07, 2010–11, 2015–16, 2016–17, 2017–18, 2021–22); 2nd Place (2012–13, 2013–14, 2014–15, 2018-19)
 Football: State Champions (1982–83); 2nd Place (1980–81,1981–82)
 Group Interpretation: State Champions (2012–13); 2nd Place (2016–17); 3rd Place (2003–04, 2008–09)
 Speech: 3rd Place (1971–72)
 Wrestling: State Champions (1960–61,1961–62,1964–65); 3rd Place (1957-28)

Reavis High School was the site for all of the wrestling matches at the 1959 Pan American Games.

Notable alumni 
 Lance Dreher (Class of 1973), two-time Mr. Universe and former Mr. America.
 Drew Fortier (Class of 2005), musician, songwriter, filmmaker, actor, and author.
 Ray Hanania (Class of 1971), journalist and comedian.
 James Chico Hernandez (Class of 1972), World Cup Silver, 3-time British silver medalist in Sambo wrestling, Amateur Athletic Union Wrestling Hall of Fame, Maine Sports Hall of Fame  and Wheaties Fame.
 Tom Lemming, college football recruiting analyst.
 Bobby Madritsch (Class of 1995), former Major League Baseball pitcher (2004–05), playing for the Seattle Mariners.
 Willy Roy (Class of 1961), former soccer coach and member of the National Soccer Hall of Fame.

References

http://www.reavisd220.org/aboutus/boardofeducation

External links
 Official site
 IHSA: Annual athletic records

Public high schools in Cook County, Illinois
Burbank, Illinois
Educational institutions established in 1950
1950 establishments in Illinois